Coleophora recula is a moth of the family Coleophoridae. It is found in Yemen.

The wingspan is about 6 mm.

References

recula
Moths of the Arabian Peninsula
Moths described in 2007